The following is a list of notable events that are related to Brazilian music in 2014.

Notable Events

Festivals

April
 Lollapalooza, the third edition of the music festival in Brazil, took place from April 5 to April 6 in Autódromo José Carlos Pace, São Paulo.

Albums released

January
 Lucas Lucco, Tá Diferente
 Mezatrio, O Topo do Nada
 Supercombo, Amianto

February
 Dilsinho, Dilsinho
 Graveola, Vozes Invisíveis
 Gusttavo Lima, Do Outro Lado da Moeda
 Juçara Marçal, Encarnado
 Mariene de Castro, Colheita
 Raimundos, Cantigas de Roda

March
 Kalouv, Pluvero
 Marcelo Perdido, Lenhador
 Raquel Mello, Há um Deus no Céu
 Sam Alves, Sam Alves
 Silva, Vista Pro Mar
 Vanessa da Mata, Segue o Som
 Fresno, Eu Sou a Maré Viva

April
 Dom Paulinho Lima, Dom Paulinho Lima
 Isaar, Todo Calor
 Ju Moraes, Em Cada Canto Um Samba
 Leo Cavalcanti, Despertador 
 Maria Rita, Coração a Batucar
 O Teatro Mágico, Grão do Corpo
 Thiaguinho, Outro Dia, Outra História

May

 Daniela Araújo, Criador do Mundo
 Detonautas Roque Clube, A Saga Continua
 Far From Alaska, modeHuman
 Fernanda Takai, Na Medida do Impossível
 Gláucia Rosane, Casa do Sobrenatural
 Ludov, Miragem
 Mombojó, Alexandre
 Moreno Veloso, Coisa Boa
 Nação Zumbi, Nação Zumbi 
 Paulo César Baruk, Graça
 Seu Cuca, MenteAberta
 Titãs, Nheengatu
 Transmissor, De Lá Não Ando Só
 Zezé Di Camargo & Luciano, Teorias de Raul

June
 Anitta, Ritmo Perfeito
 Luiz Melodia, Zerima
 Pitty, Setevidas
 Sérgio Lopes, Coração Discípulo
 Skank, Velocia

July
 Diante do Trono, Läpimurto

August
 Tânia Mara, Só Vejo Você

Deaths
 January 5 – Nelson Ned, 66, singer and songwriter
 January 17 – Milky Mota, 25, singer
 January 20 – Márcio Vip Antonucci, 68, singer and producer
 February 2 – Nonato Buzar, 81, singer and producer
 February 3 – Giba Giba, 73, singer and songwriter
 February 7 – Nico Nicolaiewsky, 56, musician
 February 10 – Virgínia Lane, 93, singer
 March 14 – Paulo Schroeber, 40, guitarist (Almah)
 May 8 – Jair Rodrigues, 75, musician and singer
 May 14 – Alexandre Pessoal, 39, singer and songwriter
 June 7 – Helcio Milito, 83, drummer
 July 14 – Vange Leonel, 51, singer and songwriter